The ge is a traditional Chinese unit of volume equal to sheng. Its Korean equivalent is the hob or hop and its Japanese equivalent is the gō.

China

The ge is a traditional Chinese unit of volume equal to 10shao or sheng. Its exact value has varied over time with the size of the sheng.

The Nationalist Government's 1929 Weights and Measures Act, effective 1 January 1930, set it equal to the deciliter  or 0.182dry pt). The People's Republic of China confirmed that value in 1959, although it made the official Chinese name of the deciliter the fēnshēng  and exempted TCM pharmacists from punishment for noncompliance with the new measure when traditional amounts were required for preparing medicine.

Korea
The hob (South Korea) or hop (North Korea) is a traditional Korean unit based on the ge which is equal to doe (SK) or toe (NK). Its exact value has varied over time with the size of the doe.

During its occupation, Korea's native measures were standardized to their Japanese equivalents. The present-day hob is litres (6.1floz or 0.328dry pt), the same as the Japanese gō. Its use for commercial purposes has been criminalized in South Korea, although it continues to be used in the North.

Japan

Volume

It was officially equated with liters in 1891. The gō is the traditional amount used for a serving of rice and a cup of sake in Japanese cuisine. Although the gō is no longer used as an official unit, 1-gō measuring cups or their 180mL metric equivalents are often included with Japanese rice cookers. In dining, a 1-gō serving is sometimes equated with 150g of Japanese short-grain rice. It also appears as a serving size for fugu and other fish. Since sake bottles are typically either 720 or 750mL, they can be reckoned as holding about four cups.

Area
The gō is also used as a unit equal to tsubo. This is approximately equal to 0.3306 m².

Mountaineering
In Japanese mountaineering terms, the distance from the foot of a mountain to the summit is divided into 10 gō, and the points corresponding to these tenths of the route are generally referred to as "stations" in English.

See also
 Japanese cup, a separate modern unit of precisely 200mL

References

Citations

Bibliography

 . 

Units of volume
Sake